1-Deoxy-11-oxopentalenate,NADH:oxygen oxidoreductase may refer to:

 Pentalenolactone D synthase
 Neopentalenolactone D synthase